SLIT and NTRK-like protein 5 is a protein that in humans is encoded by the SLITRK5 gene.

Function 

Members of the SLITRK family, such as SLITRK5, are integral membrane proteins with 2 N-terminal leucine-rich repeat (LRR) domains similar to those of SLIT proteins (see SLIT1; MIM 603742). Most SLITRKs, including SLITRK5, also have C-terminal regions that share homology with neurotrophin receptors (see NTRK1; MIM 191315). SLITRKs are expressed predominantly in neural tissues and have neurite-modulating activity (Aruga et al., 2003).[supplied by OMIM]

References

Further reading